Michel Gonneville (born 31 July 1950) is a Canadian composer.

Career
He completed his Bachelor of Music at the Conservatoire Vincent-d'Indy in Sherbrooke in 1972, where he won the premier prix in analysis and composition. He completed a Doctor of Music at the University of Montreal in 1997. From 1975 to 1978 he won grants to study in Europe, where he took Stockhausen's composition courses and participated in the electronic music studio of Hans Ulrich Humpert.

Returning to Canada in 1978, he became a teacher at the Rimouski Conservatoire, and then the University of Ottawa. His work "Chute-parachute" "was a recommended work at the International Rostrum of Composers and has become one of [his] most frequently played compositions." In 1994, he won the Serge Garant prize, which is awarded by the mile Nelligan Foundation.

References

Further reading

Gingras, Claude. "Gonneville et Longtin; deux créations à la SMCQ," Montreal La Presse, 17 Feb 1979
Petrowski, Nathalie. "Deux jeunes compositeurs à la SMCQ," Montreal Le Devoir, 19 Feb 1979
"Michel Gonneville et les architectures musicales," Canadian Composer, 142, Jun 1979
Laurier, Andrée. "Blueprints for new music," Canadian Composer, 219, Apr 1987
Olivier, Dominique. Whale music launches busy season for Michel Gonneville, Words & Music, Nov/Dec 1998

Canadian composers
Canadian male composers
1950 births
Living people